Anolis eulaemus, the good anole, is a species of lizard in the family Dactyloidae. The species is found in  Colombia.

References

Anoles
Endemic fauna of Colombia
Reptiles of Colombia
Reptiles described in 1908
Taxa named by George Albert Boulenger